Ishwarbhai Chavda was a leader of Indian National Congress from Gujarat. He represented Anand in Lok Sabha for many terms. He died in 2007.

References

2007 deaths
Lok Sabha members from Gujarat
People from Anand district
India MPs 1996–1997
India MPs 1998–1999
India MPs 1991–1996
India MPs 1984–1989
India MPs 1980–1984
Indian National Congress politicians from Gujarat